The Army Corps of Clerks of the Bangladesh Army is meant to provide combatant clerks and stenographers to the Staff Branch of Formation HQ, Station HQ, all Army Schools of Instruction and  Colleges (including the Staff College, BMA and the Military College) and the Bangladesh Military Attaches abroad and to certain specified appointments in Army Headquarters and in all Remount Veterinary & Farm Corps. This Corps has only static units of its own, i.e., the ACC Centre and has no officers of its own.

References 

Army units and formations of Bangladesh